Coleophora hsiaolingensis is a moth of the family Coleophoridae. It is found in China, Japan and Siberia.

References

hsiaolingensis
Moths described in 1942
Moths of Asia